Adriano Barbosa Miranda da Luz (born 24 August 1979), commonly known as Nené, is a Cape Verdean professional footballer who plays as a central midfielder.

Club career
Born in the capital Lisbon, Nené spent most of his professional career in Portugal. After starting out in the lower leagues, he signed in early 2002 with Primeira Liga club S.C. Braga from Gondomar SC, 31 of his 38 league games with the Minho team coming in the 2002–03 season, in a 14th-place finish.

After definitively leaving Braga (which also loaned him twice during his spell), Nené signed with U.D. Leiria which in turn loaned him to C.D. Aves, with the latter side promoting to the top division at the end of 2005–06. The move was subsequently made permanent, and the player was relatively used the following campaign – 1,131 minutes, one goal in a 2–1 away loss against Boavista FC, whom he had represented as a youth – which ended in immediate relegation.

Nené rarely settled in the following years, playing in Kuwait, Cyprus, Spain and Romania. In 2010–11, aged 31, he returned to his birth nation and joined F.C. Arouca, promoted for the first time ever to the second tier. On 12 July 2012, he switched to S.C. Covilhã of the same league.

In the summer of 2014, following a brief spell with F.C. Famalicão, Nené moved to the lower leagues with Vilaverdense FC, going on to retire well past his 30s.

International career
Nené was part of the Cape Verde squad which progressed to the second stage of the 2006 FIFA World Cup qualifiers, appearing in six out of 12 possible matches. The national team finished second bottom in their group, failing to qualify for both the competition in Germany and the 2006 Africa Cup of Nations.

References

External links

1979 births
Living people
Portuguese people of Cape Verdean descent
Citizens of Cape Verde through descent
Footballers from Lisbon
Cape Verdean footballers
Portuguese footballers
Association football midfielders
Primeira Liga players
Liga Portugal 2 players
Segunda Divisão players
F.C. Marco players
U.D. Vilafranquense players
Gondomar S.C. players
S.C. Braga B players
S.C. Braga players
C.D. Aves players
U.D. Leiria players
F.C. Arouca players
S.C. Covilhã players
F.C. Famalicão players
Vilaverdense F.C. players
Süper Lig players
Çaykur Rizespor footballers
Kuwait Premier League players
Al-Arabi SC (Kuwait) players
Cypriot First Division players
Enosis Neon Paralimni FC players
Segunda División B players
Pontevedra CF footballers
Liga I players
FC Brașov (1936) players
Cape Verde international footballers
Cape Verdean expatriate footballers
Portuguese expatriate footballers
Expatriate footballers in Turkey
Expatriate footballers in Kuwait
Expatriate footballers in Cyprus
Expatriate footballers in Spain
Expatriate footballers in Romania
Cape Verdean expatriate sportspeople in Turkey
Cape Verdean expatriate sportspeople in Kuwait
Cape Verdean expatriate sportspeople in Cyprus
Cape Verdean expatriate sportspeople in Spain
Cape Verdean expatriate sportspeople in Romania
Portuguese expatriate sportspeople in Turkey
Portuguese expatriate sportspeople in Kuwait
Portuguese expatriate sportspeople in Cyprus
Portuguese expatriate sportspeople in Spain
Portuguese expatriate sportspeople in Romania